Tom Nicolson (Thomas Rae Nicolson; 3 October 1879 – 18 April 1951) from Tighnabruaich was a British track and field athlete who competed in the 1908 Summer Olympics and in the 1920 Summer Olympics.

In 1908 he finished fourth in the hammer throw competition. He also participated in the shot put event but his final ranking is unknown. Twelve years later he finished sixth in the hammer throw competition.

Rae was a keen shinty player for Kyles Athletic, captaining the side alongside six of his brothers.  He is believed to be the only shinty summer Olympian.

References

External links
 Profile at Sports-Reference.com
 The Incomparable Thomas Rae Nicolson

1879 births
1951 deaths
Scottish male shot putters
Scottish male hammer throwers
Olympic athletes of Great Britain
Athletes (track and field) at the 1908 Summer Olympics
Athletes (track and field) at the 1920 Summer Olympics
Shinty players